Rhabderemia is a genus of sponges belonging to the family Rhabderemiidae.

The species of this genus are found in Southern Hemisphere.

Species

Species:

Rhabderemia acanthostyla 
Rhabderemia africana 
Rhabderemia antarctica

References

Sponges